Askjelldalsvatnet is a lake in the municipality of Vaksdal in Vestland county, Norway. The  lake has a dam at the southern end of the lake. The Askjelldalsvatnet dam is used to regulate the water level so that the water can be used for water power at a nearby power plant.

See also
List of lakes in Norway

References

Lakes of Vestland
Vaksdal
Reservoirs in Norway